The 1875 Athletic Baseball Club of Philadelphia finished in second place in the National Association with a record of 53-20. The team played one game in Dover, Delaware, during the season, and otherwise played its home games at Fairview Park Fair Grounds. The National Association folded after this season, and the Athletics joined the new National League for the 1876 season.

Regular season

Season standings

Record vs. opponents

Roster

Player stats

Batting

Starters by position
Note: Pos = Position; G = Games played; AB = At bats; H = Hits; Avg. = Batting average; HR = Home runs; RBI = Runs batted in

Other batters
Note: G = Games played; AB = At bats; H = Hits; Avg. = Batting average; HR = Home runs; RBI = Runs batted in

Pitching

Starting pitchers
Note: G = Games pitched; IP = Innings pitched; W = Wins; L = Losses; ERA = Earned run average; SO = Strikeouts

Relief pitchers
Note: G = Games pitched; IP = Innings pitched; W = Wins; L = Losses; ERA = Earned run average; SO = Strikeouts

References

External links
1875 Philadelphia Athletics season at Baseball Reference

Philadelphia Athletics (1860–1876) seasons
Philadelphia Athletics Season, 1875